The F+F School for Art and Design Zürich or F+F is a private art school in Zürich, Switzerland. F+F stands for "Form und Farbe" (in German, "shape and color"), a discipline practiced at the German art and architecture school Bauhaus.

History
F+F was founded in 1971 by Bendicht Fivian, Peter Gygax, Peter Jenny, Hansjörg Mattmüller, Doris Stauffer, and Serge Stauffer. F+F was an alternative to the Zurich University of the Arts, which only offered classes in applied arts.

Even though it was founded as a trade association, since 2006 the school has been supported by a non-profit foundation. The school also gets donations from both the City of Zürich and the canton of Zürich.

Before the school had any buildings, classes were taught at various locations around the city, including the Jugendkulturhaus Dynamo, which was the center of the political movements of the 1980s Zürich. Knowing they needed a larger location, F+F started the restoration of a warehouse built in 1949. This building also housed the art collection of the Swiss company UBS until they moved out in 2003. F+F has also used a painter's studio in the Rote Fabrik, since it opened. The school also runs a milk bar and a printing workshop from this location.

Education 
Art and media studies at F+F are nationally recognized higher professional qualification (Art Diploma). Matura (completion of secondary school) is not required for admission, meaning that the school offers an alternative to studying at a Swiss hochschule.

Studies at F+F are practically oriented, but the student also acquires a sound theoretical knowledge of the subject. The F+F teachers are experienced, often internationally well-known personalities who are firmly established in their field. Each term, several of these experts from Switzerland and abroad are engaged as guest professors.

Notable alumni
Stephan Eicher
Klaudia Schifferle
Muda Mathis from the band Les Reines prochaines

Christian Philipp Müller

Frantiček Klossner

Elena Könz
Simon Otto

References

Works cited

External links 

Information about F+F School for Art and Design Zurich, Switzerland in English

Schools in Zürich